Triclonella mediocris is a moth in the family Cosmopterigidae. It is found on the Virgin Islands and Puerto Rico.

References

Natural History Museum Lepidoptera generic names catalog

Cosmopteriginae
Moths of the Caribbean
Moths described in 1897